This page is a list of the characters of NX Files.

 Alain Moussi – Spike, Ronin
 Stephan Roy – Rex
 Patrick Beriault – Rio
 Marc Knowles – Sniper, Akuma
 Emilie Lavoie – Katana
 Robert Baldwin – Krush
 John Purchase – Mr. Black, Mr Brown, NXISS
 Sylvie Genest – The Prefect
 Jean-François Lachapelle – Tornado
 Matthew Danielson – Lord Tragos (Episodes 3 to 8)
 Eric Robert – Lord Tragos (Episodes 11 & 12)
 Marc-André Terrieault – Malak
 Christine Picknell – Saris
 Jeff Burgess – Rico
 Erik Jobin – The Hybrid (Episode 10)
 Marc-André Gauthier – Kruz
 Jean-Marc Gagnon – Golock

Rio

Rio is a fictional character in NX Files. He is based upon and portrayed by Patrick Beriault.

Sensei Rio is a member of Team Xtreme and a 2nd degree black belt in Mugen Budo. Rio lives life to the fullest. He's a bit of a thrill seeker, and at times will get himself into situations that would make even the most daring cringe!

With extensive training with the NX Secret, Rio has achieved Macaco Budo. Incredible agility and fluidity is not the only advantages of this power, Rio is also able to momentarily defy the laws of gravity to walk on walls, climb and jump very high.

In the siege of episode 112, "Full Circle", Rio confronted Ronin. He quickly realised that kicks and punches were no match against the brute strength of the Oni-Clone. Using his power, Rio confused Ronin, tied him up with rope, trapping him while heavy skids and wooden crates fell on him, finally putting him out of action.

Spike

Spike is a fictional character in NX Files. He is based upon and portrayed by Renshi Alain Moussi, co-owner of NX Martial Arts and Fitness. He is a lead character in the show.

Renshi Spike is one of NX Team Xtreme's dynamic leaders, and its highest-ranking member. Spike holds a 4th degree black belt in the art of Mugen Budo Jiu-Jitsu. It has been several years since Spike, his best friends Rex and Tornado formed the elite Martial Arts group Team Xtreme.

Spike is head strong, a natural leader and a passionate teacher and student of the martial arts. He is no doubt the most serious member of the Team, calm and always focused. His fighting style is powerful but fluid, his kicks are precise and effective.

He has developed the ability of Phantom Budo and can create fighting apparitions of himself at will. Although Phantom Budo is an incredibly powerful ability, Spike has yet to fully develop this awesome fighting technique.

He has also shown a slight use of Mystic Budo from time to time. In episode 108, "Origins II – Enter Lord Tragos", he was able to telekinetically open the door even when Tornado was forcing it closed.

Spike is the only member of the team who has had frequent council from the strange beings known as Mr. Black and Mr. Brown. They have guided him and warned him of the strange and unbelievable events that have taken part so far.

During the siege of Full Circle, Spike was the first to encounter the fury of Akuma. Spike managed to overtake the deadly demon and defeat him.

Unfortunately, Spike was not so lucky when the evil Lord Tragos confronted and attacked the team in the warehouse. Tragos overpowered Spike and attempted to use his Kara Takai Technique but Spike resisted. Mr. Black then appeared out of the ether and told Spike to 'let go'. Spike finally put his faith in Mr. Black and succumbed to the powerful dark forces of Tragos.

Ronin

Ronin is a fictional character in NX Files. He is portrayed by Alain Moussi.

Ronin is an Oni-Clone of Spike. He looks identical to Spike but has red hair and a large black tattoo that covers most of his right arm and shoulder.

Although he possesses the same physical characteristics as Spike, he is in fact quite different. In battle, Ronin does not utilize the same finesse as Spike; he prefers to quickly overpower and destroy his opponent.

Ronin was Tragos' first attempt at creating an Oni-Clone; however it may not be his last.

Ronin first proved his worth by fighting Tragos' top student Malak. During the final siege of Full Circle, Ronin confronted the amazing Sensei Rio in battle. Ronin dominated this fight however he was outwitted by Rio's brilliant strategy and use of the unpredictable Macaco Budo. Using a long tie-down strap, Rio tangled his blood thirsty opponent and left him trapped while heavy wooden crates and skids fell upon him.

Rex

Rex is a fictional character in NX Files. He is based upon and portrayed by Sensei Stephan Roy, co-owner of NX Martial Arts and Fitness. He is a lead character in the show.

Sensei Rex is the other brave leader of Team Xtreme. Rex holds a 3rd Dan in Mugen Budo Jiu-Jitsu and a master at numerous weapons and fighting systems just like his lifelong friends Spike and Tornado. Sometimes the joker, he is adept at keeping the Team on their toes, even at the most inopportune times!

Through his training with the NX Secret, Rex has developed the power of Sonic Budo. With this lightning speed ability, he can tip the odds, no matter how crazy the circumstances.

Apart from the villainous Lord Tragos who threatens the whole team, Rex seems to have found his own nemesis; Malak. These two characters first crossed swords in The Infiltrator when the slimy Malak attempted to infiltrate the Dojo and steal the NX Secret.

During the events of Full Circle, Malak confronted Rex for the second time; he was forced to run away once again as Rex proved too powerful for him. These humiliating defeats only fuel Malak's anger and determination. It is safe to say that Rex has not seen the last of his nemesis.

Sniper

Sniper is a fictional character in NX Files. He is based upon and portrayed by Marc Knowles

Sensei Sniper is a member of Team Xtreme and a 2nd degree black belt in Mugen Budo. He is the technology guru of the group; he holds an advanced doctorate in computer sciences. Sniper created and built most of the systems in the NX Chambers including the quirky NX Intelligence Security System (NXISS).

The NX Secret has given Sniper the power of Accu Budo; enhanced vision and reflexes make his punches and kicks incredibly fast and precise. A single strike delivered to a vital nerve is usually enough for Sniper to incapacitate an opponent.

During the events of Parallel Terror, Sniper attempted a radical experiment; he connected his computer systems directly into the NX Secret in order to provide NXISS with an unlimited source of power. The experiment failed and created a rift in the space-time fabric. A rift is an unstable portal or doorway to another dimension, and/or another time.

Sniper was the first to encounter a Hybrid, who emerged from the rift. With the help of Mr. Black, Sniper defeated the hyena-like beast. In a final noble act of sacrifice, Sniper jumped through the rift in order to close it, trapping himself on the other side.

Akuma

Akuma is a fictional character in NX Files. He has been portrayed by Peter Moscone, Marc Knowles, Alain Moussi and Eric Gratton.

Akuma is an evil demon spirit created by Mugen Kurai. The demons' essence and spirit reside within his mask. However, in order to interact and fight in the physical world, Akuma requires a body, a host. Once Akuma's mask comes in contact with someone's face, he immediately possesses the victim and gains complete control of him or her.

Akuma is recognizable by his red and black gi, black eyes and of course, his dark red mask. Akuma is an exceptional fighter, very quick and agile; his kicks even rival Spike's. He has a unique fighting style but will also inherit the styles of whoever he possesses. Akuma does not have a specific special ability like others but he does however have certain capabilities that are out of this world.

Katana

Katana is a fictional character in NX Files. She is based upon and portrayed by Emilie Lavoie.

Sensei Katana brings grace and refinement to Team Xtreme. She holds a 1st degree back belt in Mugen Budo Jiu-Jitsu and is an adept at many weapons and fighting styles. She is a cool customer when facing off against any opponent. She is known for her swift and strong techniques, and can easily defeat her opponents.

Through training with the NX Secret, Katana developed Mystic Budo. She has telepathy and very unusual but strong psychic abilities. Reading someone's thoughts, sending telepathic messages, making people believe what she wants them to, etc... these are only a few examples of what this powerful young martial artist can do.

Prior to the discovery of the NX Secret, Katana was in a deep and loving relationship with Tornado. They seemed inseparable—until Tornado became corrupted by Mugen Kurai and tried to kill his friends. In "Origins 2 – Enter Lord Tragos", Tornado defeated Spike, Spike and Sniper in his attempt to steal the NX Secret. Katana tried to talk him out of it; he struck her with an energy blast that should have killed her... but as Mr. Brown explains in "Origins 3 – Mugen Kurai", "something intervened".

In "Full Circle", Katana was the first member of Team Xtreme to reach the level of Kimaven. Unconscious and unable to help her team mates, she was somehow still psychically able to feel the pain of her defeated and dying friends. This gave her the edge she needed to transform into Kimaven. With this extraordinary and seemingly unlimited power, she easily defeated Lord Tragos. After killing the dark lord, Katana was struck with a shockwave that knocked her out of her Kimaven stage and rendered her unconscious.

Sabre

Sabre is a fictional character in NX Files.

Sensei Sabre is a 2nd degree black belt in Mugen Budo Jiu-Jitsu and a member of Team Xtreme. He is a brilliant intellect and is very knowledgeable in any subject. An exceptional fighter, Sabre also has the unique ability to talk himself out of any situation.

The NX Secret has amplified Sabre's natural abilities and given him the power of Cogno Budo. Sabre sees patterns and clarity where others see only confusion. By examining his environment and his opponent's movements, Sabre can anticipate the outcome of a fight.

Using this 'sixth sense', Sabre had no difficulty engaging a Phantom Ninja in Revelations. During Full Circle, Sabre met his match while fighting Saris. Saris' exceptional use of Macaco Budo made it almost impossible for Sabre to calculate her movements. After suffering quite a beating, Sabre was finally able to calculate the outcome. He lured Saris precisely where he wanted... trapped and humiliated behind a loading dock door.

Krush

Krush is a fictional character in NX Files. He is based upon and portrayed by Robert Baldwin.

Sensei Krush is a 2nd degree black belt in Mugen Budo. He was the last member to join Team Xtreme; little is known of his past. Krush is quiet type; in combat however, he fights emotionally which seems to fuel his power but as Mr. Black said in Calm Before the Storm: "this could potentially be a problem".

The NX Secret has given Krush the power of Iron Budo. His strength is unrivaled, his punches are destructive. Apart from Tragos, the only ninja able to face Krush in a fair fist fight is Rico.

In Full Circle, Rico surprised Krush with his own use of Iron Budo but it wasn't long before an annoyed and angry Krush overpowered Rico with his brute strength and determination and threw him into a large wooden crate.

Mr. Black and Mr. Brown

Mr. Black and Mr. Brown are a fictional character in NX Files. He is portrayed by John Purchase.

Black and Brown belong to a secret order known as the "Archons". Archons are tasked with maintaining balance throughout the physical universe. In their native form, Archons are pure energy. Archons are enlightened beings; they have long evolved from the physical form. Black and Brown have taken corporeal form to help blend in while on Earth.

Archons have minds that have developed far beyond the confines of human intellect. They have powers that include instant translocation, psychokinetics, and simultaneous interdimensional existence. Although non-corporeal, every archon still possess skills amazing combat, statesman and teaching skills.

Among the Archons, Mr. Black is the most senior and powerful member.

Black has an alter-being called Mr. Brown. Brown is less experienced than Black. This is apparent as he is much more eager to fight or even destroy an entire planet just to bring an issue to an end.

Mr. Black and Mr. Brown first appear on Earth to investigate energy disturbances and episodes of imbalance coinciding with the accidental discovery of the NX Secret.

Archons and their governing counsel despise Hybrids. The sentiment is equally shared by the Hybrid brood.

Tornado

Tornado is a fictional character in NX Files. He is portrayed by Jean-François Lachapelle.

Sensei Tornado holds a 3rd degree black belt in Mugen Budo as well as black belts in many other martial arts including Karate. He was the third leader of Team Xtreme along Spike and Rex. Even before discovering the NX Secret, Tornado was always a master at flying kicks and incredible jumps, flips and spins. It is no wonder he got the name 'Tornado'.

After discovering the NX Secret, Tornado achieved a form of Mystic Budo. His power however, is quite different from that of Katana's. He has minimal telepathic abilities but extremely developed telekinetic powers. Using only his mind, he can move objects, throw people around, jump extremely high and even levitate for short periods of time.

Prior to the discovery of the NX Secret, Tornado and Katana were in love and seemingly destined to marry. This all changed when Tornado's mind became confused and corrupted. For reasons unknown, Tornado's exposure to the NX Secret attracted the dark powers of Mugen Kurai. These evil powers fed his mind with hate and greed, so much so that he became jealous and paranoid of his friends. The more he trained with the NX Secret, the more powerful these negative feelings became. This eventually manifested a new tragic personality inside him; an alter-ego that called itself Tragos.

After being asked to leave by his own team mates in Origins 2 – Enter Lord Tragos, Tornado's rage overcame him. Driven by his alter-ego Tragos, not even his beloved Katana could persuade him to stop. In his final confrontation with Spike and Rex, Tornado allowed Tragos to take control. He transformed and became the dark lord himself.

Reduced to only a voice in Tragos' head, Tornado regretted his destructive actions and wanted to go back to the way things were.

In a final symbolic act in Origins 3 – Mugen Kurai, Tragos crushes a picture in the palm of his hand, silencing the last remaining echoes of his former life. Tornado, the kind and loving Tornado, ceased to exist.

Lord Tragos

Lord Tragos is a fictional character in NX Files. He was portrayed by Matthew Danielson in episodes 3 to 8 in season 1. He is now portrayed by Eric Robert.

Lord Tragos is Team Xtreme's nemesis and the leader of the Kurai Kai. He is an exceptional martial artist and a dangerously powerful practitioner of Mugen Kurai.
He wears a long black cloak, mostly used to intimidate his followers but prefers to fight in a black gi and traditional hakama pants.

Tragos still mainly uses Tornado's Mystic Budo powers but as since learned many more abilities. Speed, strength, agility, accuracy are only some of the advantages the evil lord possesses. He has also learned how to manipulate energy and on occasion, rise to the level of Oni-Kurai.

Lord Tragos was originally a founding member of Team Xtreme. He was known as Tornado. When Tornado became corrupted by Mugen Kurai, the newly created personality named Tragos took over. In his first confrontation with Team Xtreme, Tragos was soundly defeated.

After this battle, Tragos seemingly "stumbled" onto the Book of Mugen Kurai. From this book, his thirst for power grew stronger. He recruited young gang members, trained them and formed the Kurai Kai. Malak was his first student and remains his right-hand man.

Although he grows stronger every day with the Book of Mugen Kurai, Tragos still obsesses over the NX Secret; he needs it to satisfy his unending hunger for greater and greater power. After many failed attempts by his ninjas to recover the Secret, Tragos devised a plan to lure Team Xtreme to his hideout. He planned to kill them then simply take NX Secret afterwards.

In his final combat in Full Circle, Lord Tragos defeated Team Xtreme and even killed their leader Spike with his Kara Takai ability. He thought victory was his when suddenly an unconscious Katana transformed into Kimaven in a blinding explosion of power. Tragos powered up to Oni-Kurai but it still wasn't enough to destroy her. Tragos died hearing Katana's final words: 'goodbye Tornado'.

Malak

Malak is a fictional character in NX Files. He is portrayed by Marc-André Terriault.

Malak was the first member of the Kurai Kai and the first student of Lord Tragos. No one knows his real name or why he was named Malak. Before being recruited by Tragos, he was local gang leader who organized underground fight clubs.

After receiving his initial training, Malak was given the task of recruiting more members for Tragos' army. Most ninjas of the Kurai Kai have been trained in part by Malak, including the formidable Rico and the deadly Saris.

Malak was also charged with the duties of finding better facilities for the Kurai Kai

Malak is a dirty fighter, he has no problem hitting from behind or running away when a fight isn't going his way. This trait is demonstrated twice with his encounters with Rex. He has also matched Sensei Rex by developing the power of Sonic Budo through his Mugen Kurai training.

Saris

Saris is a fictional character in NX Files. She is portrayed by Christine Picknell.

Saris is a top level ninja of the Kurai Kai. She was trained mostly by Malak but also by Lord Tragos himself. Don't be fooled by her looks, Saris is a trained killing machine. It's no wonder she quickly rose up to become one of Tragos' top students.

Saris has developed Macaco Budo, her movements are elegant, graceful and precise. She confuses her opponents with her unpredictable movements. With this advantage, she nearly always dominates the fight.

In "Full Circle", Saris proved quite a challenge for Sabre. Even with his heightened intellect, he could not predict her movements. She was finally outwitted when Sabre lured her away and trapped her behind a door. The fight was over, but Saris was not defeated.

Rico

Rico is a fictional character in NX Files. He is portrayed by Jeff Burgess

Rico is a top level ninja of the Kurai Kai. He was trained by both Malak and Tragos. With his strong build and incredible strength, Rico has no problem taking a hit... but be warned, if you do hit him, he will repay you in kind manyfold! Rico is hot tempered and lacks patience; not traits usually found in a martial artist however he is still a great fighter.

Rico uses Iron Budo, and his strength is rivalled only by one: Krush. Rico hates Krush; he has made it his personal objective to become stronger so he can one day destroy him.

Rico's first encounter with Krush was in "Full Circle". He showed Krush just how strong he was; Rico dominated the fight at first but that only frustrated Krush further. He was eventually overpowered and thrown against a wall, taking him out of the action!

Kruz

Kruz is a fictional character in NX Files. He is based upon and portrayed by Marc-André Gauthier.

Sensei Kruz is a 2nd degree black belt in Mugen Budo and a member of Team Xtreme who has been gone for over 5 years. Kruz was a member of the team back in the days before the NX Secret. Five years ago, he went on a journey around the world to learn new and different martial arts and train under countless masters from all over the globe.

Kruz is a brilliant post-graduate student of many sciences, including quantum physics. It was Kruz and Sniper who developed many of the systems in the NX Chambers; although Kruz never imagined they would be put to any good use.

Golock

Golock is a fictional character in NX Files. He is portrayed by Jean-Marc Gagnon.

References

Martial artist characters in television